Gymnosoma indicum is an Asian species of fly in the family Tachinidae.

References

Phasiinae
Diptera of Asia
Insects described in 1853
Taxa named by Francis Walker (entomologist)